Charles Rogers may refer to:

Arts and entertainment
Charles Rogers (collector) (1711–1784), English customs official, known as an art collector
Charles Rogers (director) (born 1987), American film director and screenwriter
Charles "Buddy" Rogers (1904–1999), American actor and jazz musician
Charles R. Rogers (1892–1957), American film producer
Charley Rogers (1887–1956), British actor, film director and screenwriter who was sometimes credited as Charles Rogers

Sports
Charlie Rogers (born 1976), American football running back and wide receiver in the National Football League
Charles Rogers (American football coach) (1902–1986), American football coach
Charles Rogers (cricketer) (1823–1887), English cricketer
Charles Rogers (sailor) (born 1937), American Olympic sailor
Charles Rogers (wide receiver) (1981–2019), American football wide receiver

Other
Charles Rogers (author) (1825–1890), Scottish minister and historical writer
Charles Rogers (murder suspect) (1921–1975), American pilot, geologist, murder suspect
Charles Rogers (New York politician) (1800–1874), U.S. Representative from New York
Charles Calvin Rogers (1929–1990), United States Army officer and Medal of Honor recipient
Charles Cassius Rogers (1849–1937), Wisconsin State Senator
Charles Coltman-Rogers (born Charles Coltman Rogers; 1854–1929), British agriculturalist and politician
Charles P. Rogers (1829–1917), American furniture industrialist and banker from New York City